Colleges within universities in the United Kingdom can be divided into two broad categories: those in federal universities such as the University of London, which are primarily teaching institutions joined in a federation, and residential colleges in universities following (to a greater or lesser extent) the traditional collegiate pattern of Oxford and Cambridge, which may have academic responsibilities but are primarily residential and social. The legal status of colleges varies widely, both with regard to their corporate status and their status as educational bodies. London colleges are all considered 'recognised bodies' with the power to confer University of London degrees and, in many cases, their own degrees. Colleges of Oxford, Cambridge, Durham and the University of the Highlands and Islands (UHI) are 'listed bodies', as "bodies that appear to the Secretary of State to be constituent colleges, schools, halls or other institutions of a university". Colleges of the plate glass universities of Kent, Lancaster and York, along with those of the University of Roehampton and the University of the Arts London do not have this legal recognition. Colleges of Oxford (with three exceptions), Cambridge, London, and UHI, and the "recognised colleges" and "licensed halls" of Durham, are separate corporations, while the colleges of other universities, the "maintained colleges" of Durham, and the "societies of the university" at Oxford are parts of their parent universities and do not have independent corporate existence.

In the past, many of what are now British universities with their own degree-awarding powers were colleges which had their degrees awarded by either a federal university (such as Cardiff University) or validated by another university (for example many of the post-1992 universities). Colleges that had (or have) courses validated by a university are not normally considered to be colleges of that university; similarly the redbrick universities that, as university colleges, prepared students for University of London External Degrees were not considered colleges of that university. Some universities (e.g. Cardiff University) refer to their academic faculties as "colleges", such purely academic subdivisions are not within the scope of this article.

Traditional collegiate universities

Oxford and Cambridge

The two ancient universities of England, Oxford and Cambridge (collectively termed Oxbridge), both started without colleges (in the late eleventh and early thirteenth century respectively). The first college at Oxford, University College, was founded in 1249, and the first at Cambridge, Peterhouse, followed in 1284.  Over the following centuries, the universities evolved into federations of autonomous colleges, with a small central university body, rather than universities in the common sense. While many of the student affairs functions are housed in the colleges, each college is more than a residence hall, but they are far from being universities. While college life and membership is an important part of the Oxbridge experience and education, only the central university body has degree-awarding power. Historically the colleges were created as a way of ensuring discipline among the notoriously unruly students. While most colleges at the two universities are independent corporations, three Oxford colleges (Kellogg College, St Cross College, and Reuben College) are "societies" established and maintained by the central university; the newest, Reuben College, was formally established in 2019 and admitted its first students in 2021.

In addition to accommodation, meals, common rooms, libraries, sporting and social facilities for its students, most colleges admit undergraduate students to the university and, through tutorials or supervisions (but not classes), contribute to the work of educating them, together with the university's departments/faculties.

The faculties at each university provide lectures and central facilities such as libraries and laboratories, as well as examining for and awarding degrees. Academic staff are commonly employed both by the university (typically as lecturer or professor) and by a college (as fellow or tutor), though some may have only a college or university post. Nearly all colleges cater to students studying a range of subjects.

At many colleges, the uniquely British custom of comensality is followed, meaning faculty usually eat together with students within their college, sharing ("co-") a table ("mensa").

Almost all of the Oxbridge colleges are fully independent legal entities within the universities, owning their own buildings, employing their own staff, and managing their own endowments. The colleges vary widely in wealth; the richer colleges often provide financial support to the poorer ones. It is entirely possible for some colleges to be in better financial health than the universities of which they are a part. Currently about 2/3 of the £4.3 billion endowment of Cambridge University is in the hands of its colleges, and therefore just 1/3 belongs to the central university.

Typically a student or fellow of an Oxbridge college is said to be "living in college" if their accommodation is inside the college buildings. Most colleges also accommodate students, especially graduate students, in houses or other buildings away from the college site.

Graduate students do not receive education from their college. Graduate students at Cambridge and Oxford have to name two college choices on their application, which goes to the department/faculty, and if the university accepts them, it guarantees that the applicant will have a college membership, although not necessarily at the favoured college(s).

Durham University

Durham University is also collegiate in nature, and its colleges hold the same legal status of 'listed bodies' as the colleges of Oxford and Cambridge. Durham's colleges are (with two exceptions) owned by the university. They are explicitly defined in the university's statutes, meaning that permission of the Privy Council is needed to create (or abolish) colleges.

At the time of Durham's foundation, Oxford and Cambridge were the only two universities in England, thus Durham, following their example, pursued a collegiate model from the start. Two important innovations were, however, made that were later taken up for the colleges of the plate glass universities (below) and the residential colleges of US universities: the colleges at Durham were (starting with the original University College) owned by the university rather than being independent like Oxbridge colleges; and the teaching was done centrally rather than in the colleges, with the colleges being residential and responsible for student discipline, as had originally been the case at Oxford and Cambridge. The Durham model has been described as "a far better model for people at other institutions to look to, than are the independent colleges of Oxford and Cambridge".

This model was challenged by the admission to the university as teaching colleges of the College of Medicine and Armstrong College in Newcastle (now Newcastle University) in the latter half of the 19th century, and more recently of University College, Stockton (since divided into two non-teaching colleges with teaching organised separately). Hild Bede also surrendered its teacher training duties to the university on becoming a maintained college in 1979. Generally, Durham colleges are not now financially independent, exceptions being the recognised colleges of St Chad's and St John's, and Ushaw College, a licensed hall of residence. While university teaching is not carried out in the colleges, St John's College has teaching in Cranmer Hall, a Church of England theological college; St Chad's College also trained Anglican priests until the 1970s and Ushaw College was a Catholic seminary until 2011.

Although the colleges do not have any teaching duties as part of the university, they do provide meals, common rooms, libraries, sporting, scholarships and social facilities for their members. The colleges also play a large role in the pastoral care of students, with each college having a personal tutorial system, JCR, MCR and SCR and either a master or principal in charge of the everyday running of the college. The colleges have a role in the admissions of students, although not as large as those at Oxbridge, and normally confined to identifying students that suit the college ethos and atmosphere – departments are responsible for admissions to the university, each college for admissions to that college. Applicants can indicate their college preference through UCAS, as with Oxford and Cambridge.

As of 2020/21, there are 17 colleges in Durham City (one, Ustinov, postgraduate only): the 5 Bailey colleges located on the historic peninsula, which are usually thought of as being more traditional; the 10 Hill colleges on Elvet Hill, near the Mountjoy site on the south side of Durham; Ustinov College in Neville's Cross; and the College of St Hild and St Bede on the Leazes Road site on the north bank of the Wear. Two colleges previously based at the Queen's Campus in Stockton-on-Tees relocated to Durham over 2017–2018. Ushaw College, a few miles west of Durham, remains a licensed hall of residence but has not taken students since closing as a seminary in 2011. The 17th college, South College opened in September 2020.

University of Lancaster

The University of Lancaster is defined by its royal charter to be a collegiate university. It has nine colleges, eight of which are for undergraduate students and one – Graduate College – which is for postgraduate students. The undergraduate colleges consist of: Bowland; Cartmel; County; Furness; Fylde; Grizedale; Lonsdale and Pendle, all of which have their own bars with different themes. The undergraduate colleges were founded between 1964 (when the university was established) and 1974, with Graduate College being added in 1992.

All students and staff at Lancaster are college members. Colleges are independent of university education, instead providing on-campus accommodation, social events and sporting teams. Undergraduate students must choose from one of the eight undergraduate colleges; on-campus accommodation is usually a key factor in this choice. Postgraduate students are always assigned to the Graduate college, whereas staff members may choose any college. Students must pay a college membership fee. There is a programme of inter-college sports, with the winner being awarded the Carter Shield.

University of York

The University of York is collegiate and as of December 2022 there are eleven colleges. The colleges are more centralised than at Oxbridge and although they are not listed bodies they perform the same roles as colleges at Durham, and they play an important role in the pastoral care of the student body. One college, Wentworth, is postgraduate only. The day-to-day running of the colleges is managed by an elected committee of staff and student members chaired by the college's Provost. Colleges have a junior common room for undergraduate students, which is managed by the elected junior common room committee, and a graduate common room for post-graduate students, as well as a senior common room, which is managed by elected representatives of the college's academic and administrative members.

Intercollegiate sport is one of the main activities of the colleges. Currently there are 21 leagues with weekly fixtures, in addition a number of one day events are organised as well. In 2014 the "College Varsity" tournament was created, with sporting competitions held between York's colleges and the colleges of Durham University. York hosted the first tournament which was won by Durham's colleges; the second tournament was hosted by Durham in 2015, who won again. The third tournament was held in York in 2016, with York winning for the first time, and the fourth in Durham in 2017, with the hosts reclaiming the title.

University of Kent
All students at the University of Kent are part of one of the eight colleges. Each college has a Master, who is responsible for enforcing University regulations and ensuring safe student conduct. Each college also has an elected student committee. There are seven colleges (Eliot, Rutherford, Keynes, Darwin, Turing, Park Wood, and Woolf) on the Canterbury campus, with Woolf being "mainly postgraduate", and Medway College on the Medway campus. The initial four colleges (Elliot, Rutherford, Keynes and Darwin) were established between 1965 and 1970, after which no new college was established at the Canterbury campus until Woolf in 2008. This has since been followed by Turing (2014) and Park Wood (2020). Chaucer College (1992), located on the same campus, enjoys some common life with the University of Kent, but remains independent, and is not a constituent college of the university.

University of Roehampton
The University of Roehampton, London has its roots in the traditions of its four constituent colleges – Digby Stuart, Froebel, Southlands and Whitelands – which were all formed in the 19th century. Each college has a "providing body", an independent charity that owns the freehold or leasehold interest of the college's property. The university holds long-term leases and management agreements with the providing bodies for three of the colleges, and a rolling seven-year licensed and management agreement for Whitelands. While the colleges were all originally independent, they have now merged into the university, with the last college (Whitelands) merging in 2012.

Federal universities

University of London

The University of London is a federal university comprising 17 member institutions. Following the passing of the University of London Act 2018, constituent colleges can apply to become universities in their own right while remaining members of the federal university; twelve of the colleges applied for university status in 2019. The university's statutes under the 2018 act allow for member institutions to have either "the status of a college" or "the status of a university";  all 17 member institutions remain colleges.

For most practical purposes, ranging from admissions to funding, the member institutions operate on a semi-independent basis, with many having awarded their own degrees whilst remaining in the federal university since 2008. For historical reasons the two founding colleges, University College and King's College, have names resembling those of Oxbridge colleges.

As originally established in 1836, London was an examining board and degree awarding body for affiliated colleges. Starting with UCL and King's, which were named in the original charter, the list of affiliated colleges grew to include everything from grammar schools to the universities of the British Empire by 1858, when the affiliated college system was abandoned and London's degree examinations thrown open to anyone. Following a campaign led by UCL and King's in the late 19th century, the university became a federal body in 1900. The Constitution evolved during the 20th century, with power shifting towards the central University and then back towards the colleges. In the mid-1990s the colleges gained direct access to government funding and the right to confer University of London degrees themselves, and from 2008 those colleges that held their own degree awarding powers were allowed to use them while remaining part of the federation.

The nine largest colleges of the university are King's College London; University College London; Birkbeck; Goldsmiths; the London Business School; Queen Mary; Royal Holloway; SOAS; and the London School of Economics and Political Science. The specialist colleges of the university include the Royal Veterinary College, the Courtauld Institute of Art and St George's, specialising in medicine. Imperial College London was formerly a member before it left the University of London in 2007 on becoming a university in its own right. Heythrop College was a former college specialising in philosophy and theology that closed in 2018.

Later the expansion of the university saw the growth of the small specialist colleges such as the Royal Academy of Music and Institute of Education, University of London (now part of UCL) either by being established within or merging into the university.

Since the mid-1990s, all University of London colleges have been Recognised Bodies with the right to confer University of London degrees. From 2005 onwards, the Privy Council has granted independent degree awarding powers to most of the colleges, many of which have, since 2008, awarded their own degrees rather than London degrees.

The University of London also has three Central Academic Bodies: the School of Advanced Study, the University of London Institute in Paris (ULIP), and the University of London Worldwide, which are under the direct control of the central University and are not considered colleges.

University of Wales
In the University of Wales, colleges were the lower tier of institutional membership in the federal structure, below constituent institutions, following the reorganisation of the university in 1996. Prior to this, the member institutions were all called colleges. After 2007 the colleges and constituent institutions all became independent universities, with the University of Wales shifting to a confederal structure where it validated degrees from these and other institutions. This arrangement ended in 2011 and it was announced that the university would merge with the University of Wales Trinity Saint David. From August 2017 the two institutions have been functionality merged.

University of the Arts London
The University of the Arts London (UAL) comprises six specialist art and design colleges, dating from the mid-1850s, that were brought together for administrative purposes. The colleges are not Listed Bodies and do not have separate legal status, but maintain their separate identity and teach their own courses within the university. As a consortium of teaching colleges, each teaching their own courses, joined under the umbrella of the central University, UAL is essentially federal, but differs from UHI and London in that its colleges are not independent bodies.

University of the Highlands and Islands

The University of the Highlands and Islands (UHI) is a federal collegiate university consisting of 13 independent "academic partner" colleges and a central executive office. Like the colleges of Oxford, Cambridge and Durham, and those of London prior to the mid-1990s, UHI colleges are Listed Bodies.

Universities with associated colleges
A few universities, while operating as unitary institutions, have associated colleges in federal relationships.

Queen's University Belfast

Queen's University Belfast has a federal relationship with two associated university colleges, Stranmillis University College and St Mary's University College. These are listed bodies under part two of the listed bodies order, the same status as colleges of Oxford, Cambridge, Durham and the University of the Highlands and Islands.

University of South Wales

The University of South Wales encompasses the Royal Welsh College of Music and Drama. Like the university colleges associated with Queen's University Belfast, this is a listed body under part two of the listed bodies order.

See also
Sixth form college
University college
List of colleges and universities
List of residential colleges
House system
Residential College

References 

Educational stages
Universities and colleges in the United Kingdom